Kostelany is a municipality and village in Kroměříž District in the Zlín Region of the Czech Republic. It has about 600 inhabitants.

Administrative parts
Villages of Lhotka and Újezdsko are administrative parts of Kostelany.

References

Villages in Kroměříž District